Lioubov Galkina (born 15 March 1973 in Alapayevsk, Russian SFSR) is a Russian sport shooter and Olympic champion. She received two medals at the 2004 Summer Olympics in Athens.

Olympic results

Records

References

1973 births
Living people
People from Alapayevsk
Russian female sport shooters
Shooters at the 2000 Summer Olympics
Shooters at the 2004 Summer Olympics
Shooters at the 2008 Summer Olympics
Shooters at the 2012 Summer Olympics
Olympic shooters of Russia
Olympic gold medalists for Russia
Olympic silver medalists for Russia
World record holders in shooting
Olympic medalists in shooting
Medalists at the 2008 Summer Olympics
Medalists at the 2004 Summer Olympics
Sportspeople from Sverdlovsk Oblast
21st-century Russian women